Rachel Susan Christabel Buckland (1873–1946) was a New Zealand artist. Her watercolour paintings are included in the collection of Hocken Library.

Biography 
Buckland was born in Waikouaiti in Otago, New Zealand. Her father was the politician John Buckland. She attended a private school in Dunedin where she met and became friends with Fanny Wimperis. The pair painted together in Dunedin and the surrounding countryside. In about 1893 the family moved to Taieri Lake Station and Buckland continued to paint watercolours there.

Personal life 
In 1901 she married a farmer, Lionel Orbell in Winchester. The couple lived at Geraldine for some years, then moved to Fairfield Farm at Pukeuri. One of their children, Geoffrey Orbell, was a noted naturalist.

References 

1873 births
1946 deaths
20th-century New Zealand artists
Rachel
Fairburn–Newman family